This is a list of Washington State Cougars selected in the NFL Draft.

Key

Selections

See also
List of Washington State University people

References

Washington State

Washington State Cougars NFL Draft